"Wonderful" is a song by the American rock band the Beach Boys from their 1967 album Smiley Smile and their unfinished Smile project. Written by Brian Wilson and Van Dyke Parks, the song tells the story of a young girl's sexual awakening and its disruption of her devotion to God and her parents. It was the only "boy-girl" song they wrote for Smile.

Numerous early versions of the song were recorded by the group from August 1966 to April 1967 at three different Hollywood studios. It was originally sung by Wilson with harpsichord, trumpet, and the group's backing vocals as accompaniment. The arrangement for Smiley Smile differed significantly and was recorded in a single three-hour session at Wilson's makeshift home studio. This version featured Carl Wilson on lead vocal, supported by piano and organ, and a 35-second doo-wop interlude.

The original Smile version was released on the compilations Good Vibrations: Thirty Years of the Beach Boys (1993) and The Smile Sessions (2011). As a solo artist, Brian rerecorded the song twice, for the albums I Just Wasn't Made for These Times (1995) and Brian Wilson Presents Smile (2004). Cover versions of "Wonderful" have been recorded by artists including Nikki Sudden, David Garland, Adventures in Stereo, and Rufus Wainwright.

Background and lyricism

"Wonderful" is one of the numerous songs Brian Wilson and Van Dyke Parks wrote for the Beach Boys' never-finished album Smile. The song title derived from a pet name Wilson had for his then-wife Marilyn. It was the only "boy/girl song" written for the project. Van Dyke Parks recalled,

The lyrics tell the story of a girl whose meeting with a boy disrupts her devotion to God and her parents. Of the songs on Smile, some of which deal with spiritual themes, "Wonderful" is the only one that refers to God explicitly. Music journalist David Zahl wrote that although "The Lord gets a mention in 'Wonderful'", it is "mainly as a somewhat creepy device to deal with adolescent sexuality."  Biographer Mark Dillon interpreted the interlude on the Smiley Smile rendition as a musical representation of the female protagonist's sexual awakening.

Parks was not initially credited as one of the writers of "Wonderful". He was awarded an official writing credit after broaching the issue with Wilson in 2003.

Recording

Smile sessions
"Wonderful" was one of the first songs attempted for Smile, and according to historian Keith Badman, none of the Smile recordings of "Wonderful" were finished versions of the song. The original is a harpsichord-led arrangement supported by trumpet and the group's backing vocals.

The basic track for the first version was recorded on August 25, 1966 at Western Studio. It took 18 takes to record; Wilson had trouble playing the harpsichord. At one point in the session, he remarked to engineer Chuck Britz, "Some of these notes are fucking up. I swear to God. You push them and they don't go." On October 6, Wilson overdubbed a lead vocal onto the track. Drums and other instruments are also added to the track during the session. Wilson then created a rough mix of the track. Further vocals were recorded for the song on December 15 at Columbia Studio.

On January 9, 1967, the second version (known as the "Rock with Me Henry" version) was recorded at Western. Badman speculated that Wilson "consider[ed] this another potential candidate for the B-side of 'Heroes and Villains'." A third version of the song, with piano as the sole accompaniment, was recorded by the band around April 10 at Armin Steiner's Sound Recorders Studio.  On April 29, publicist Derek Taylor reported that a single, "Vegetables" backed with "Wonderful", would soon be released. Regarding "Wonderful", he wrote, "I only heard [it] improvised at the piano with the boys humming the theme for Paul [McCartney]."

Smiley Smile sessions
From June to July 1967, the Beach Boys recorded simplified versions of Smile-period songs, including "Wonderful", for the forthcoming album Smiley Smile. According to Dillon, "Wonderful" had "the most radical reinterpretation". It was recorded in one three-hour session at Wilson's makeshift home studio. Carl Wilson sang the lead vocal with piano and organ as accompaniment.

This version omitted one verse from the original lyrics. Instead, the section consists of a 35-second interlude described by Dillon as "a left turn into a hash den". Dillon believed that, amid the group's giggling and nonsense doo-wop chanting, the phrase "don't think you're God" can be heard in the mass of voices.

"Wonderbill"
In 1972, the Beach Boys performed "Wonderful" at numerous concert dates in medley with the Flames' song "Don't Worry Bill". They nicknamed the medley "Wonderbill".

Recognition and legacy

For his curation of the 2002 compilation Classics Selected by Brian Wilson, Wilson chose the Smiley Smile version of "Wonderful" as one of his favorite songs by the Beach Boys. It is also Mike Love's favorite song from Smile. In a 2011 interview, he commended Parks' "marvelous job" with the lyrics and described the piece as beautiful, sensitive, and possessing the ability to move listeners to tears. In 2012, he added, "'Wonderful' is an amazing, amazing piece of work. Holy shit! Van Dyke and Brian did a great collaboration on that one. It’s a really beautiful song. That’s probably my favorite thing from the Smile project."

Musician Matthew Sweet praised the Smile version for its baroque feel, although he decreed, the song "gets a little more trivialized on Smiley Smile". In a 2011 interview, Darian Sahanaja said, "I remember around 1984 or ’85 getting one of the first cassettes with Smile bootlegs floating around and hearing this version of 'Wonderful' with Brian playing harpsichord. That pretty much changed my life. It sounded to me like the natural link between Pet Sounds and 'Heroes & Villains.' So amazing. Even now, when I think of Smile I think of that piece." Dillon characterized the Smile version as "proto-psychedelic chamber pop" and the Smiley Smile rendition as "Beach Boys' Party! on acid."  He wrote, "If Smile was indeed shelved in part because any band members found the music too weird, it is inconceivable that they would have seen this as any more accessible."

Release history

 In 1993, the original  Smile version was released on the compilation Good Vibrations: Thirty Years of the Beach Boys.
 In 1995, Wilson performed the Smile version of "Wonderful" for the documentary I Just Wasn't Made for These Times. The rendition was included on the accompanying soundtrack album.
 In 1998, a live rendition from 1972 was included on the compilation Endless Harmony Soundtrack.
 In 2004, Wilson rerecorded the song for Brian Wilson Presents Smile and released this version as the album's second single.
 In 2011, several alternate versions of the song were included on the compilation The Smile Sessions.
 In 2013, a live rendition from 1993 was included on the compilation Made in California.

Personnel
Per band archivist Craig Slowinski, the following credits pertain to the Smile versions.

Version 1 (August 25, 1966)

Al Jardine – backing vocals
Bruce Johnston – backing vocals
Larry Knechtel – grand piano
Mike Love – backing vocals
Lyle Ritz – upright bass, overdubbed tenor ukulele
Alan Weight – trumpet
Brian Wilson – lead and backing vocals, harpsichord
Carl Wilson – backing vocals
Dennis Wilson – backing vocals

Version 2 (January 9, 1967)

Hal Blaine – overdubbed drums
Carol Kaye – Danelectro fuzz bass (uncertain edit)
Ray Pohlman – overdubbed mandolin (uncertain credit)
Lyle Ritz – overdubbed upright bass
Brian Wilson – backing vocals, harpsichord
Carl Wilson – lead and backing vocals

Version 3 (April 10, 1967 [uncertain date])
Al Jardine – vocals
Mike Love – doubletracked vocals
Brian Wilson – vocals, grand piano
Carl Wilson – vocals

Cover versions

1990 – Nikki Sudden & the Mermaids, Smiles, Vibes & Harmony: A Tribute to Brian Wilson
1993 – David Garland, I Guess I Just Wasn't Made for These Times
1996 – Outrageous Cherry, Stereo Action Rant Party
1998 – Adventures in Stereo, Smiling Pets
1998 – Sportsguitar, Smiling Pets
2009 – Rufus Wainwright, War Child Presents Heroes

Notes

References

Bibliography

External links
 
 
 
 
 
 
 
 

1967 songs
The Beach Boys songs
Brian Wilson songs
Chamber pop songs
Psychedelic pop songs
Songs written by Brian Wilson
Songs written by Van Dyke Parks
Song recordings produced by Brian Wilson
Song recordings produced by the Beach Boys
2011 singles
2004 singles